Squirrel Girl (Doreen Allene Green) is a superheroine appearing in American comic books published by Marvel Comics. Created by writer Will Murray and writer/artist Steve Ditko, she first appeared in Marvel Super-Heroes vol. 2 #8, a.k.a. Marvel Super-Heroes Winter Special (cover-dated Winter 1991). Murray created the character out of a desire to write lighthearted stories, in contrast to the heavily dramatic tales that were then norm in mainstream comics.

Although distinct from Marvel's mutants, Doreen has a genetic anomaly which gives her the ability to communicate with squirrels. She has been a member of both the Avengers and the Great Lakes Avengers, and has been a supporting character in stories featuring Luke Cage and Jessica Jones. Doreen has also appeared in her own solo series, which have depicted her dividing her time between her superhero adventures and her work as a college student.

Publication history

Creation and development
Squirrel Girl was created by writer Will Murray and artist Steve Ditko, making her debut in "The Coming of ... Squirrel Girl" in Marvel Super-Heroes vol. 2 #8, a.k.a. Marvel Super-Heroes Winter Special (cover-date Winter 1991). She ambushes the superhero Iron Man, teams up with him, and, after Iron Man is captured, defeats the villainous Doctor Doom. The story also introduces her squirrel sidekick, Monkey Joe.

Murray has since described the character's genesis:

Later appearances
Squirrel Girl next appeared in Marvel Year-In-Review '92, where she made a one-panel appearance in the self-satirizing book's Marvel 2099 section, where "Squirrel Girl: 2099" was listed as one of "the 2099 books we've pretty much ruled out" as actual future titles. Later, she was slated to join the New Warriors, but writer Fabian Nicieza left Marvel before going through with his plan. In 1997, Fleer-Skybox released cards based on Marvel Superheroes, one of which was a more sexualized version of Squirrel Girl.

She did not appear again for nearly a decade. She was mentioned only once in comics during that time: In Deadpool #7, Deadpool's friend/maid/mother-figure/prisoner Blind Al mentions accidentally putting "bleach in with [Deadpool's] Squirrel Girl Underoos."

In 2005, comic writer Dan Slott wrote a four-issue miniseries for the superhero team the Great Lakes Avengers. Created in 1989, this team was made up of enthusiastic heroes with bizarre and nearly useless abilities. They had appeared only a handful of times over their 16-year history, serving as comic relief. As part of the team's series, roster changes were made and the Squirrel Girl character was revived and included on the team. The miniseries satirized comic book deaths, and it was announced that a team member would die in every issue. After Squirrel Girl made a fuss to ensure that Monkey Joe would be an official member of the team, he was killed in the third issue. Slott would also pen further appearances for her and the team in the Christmas-themed GLX-Mas Special and GLI/Deadpool Summer Fun Spectacular one-shots. Slott's stories satirized Squirrel Girl's unlikely victory over Doctor Doom from her debut appearance by depicting her as capable of defeating some of Marvel's other highest-ranking supervillains, including MODOK, the Mandarin, and Thanos, mostly in comedically unexplained, off-panel ways.

During 2006's "Civil War" company-wide story arc, Squirrel Girl and the rest of the team fought Deadpool in Cable & Deadpool #30. In 2007, she and the newly renamed "Great Lakes Initiative" again appeared alongside Deadpool in the Deadpool/GLI Summer Fun Spectacular one-shot.

In September 2010's release of the five-part story line I am an Avenger, Squirrel Girl appears in the first issue in the story "Welcome Home Squirrel Girl." The premise of the story was simply Squirrel Girl coming home to Manhattan.

Squirrel Girl appears as a supporting character sporadically in the 2010-2013 The New Avengers series, from issue #7 (February 2011) through its final issue #34 (January 2013). She is not a member of the team, but works as a super-powered nanny for the daughter of Luke Cage and Jessica Jones while attending New York University.

The Unbeatable Squirrel Girl

On October 6, 2014, Marvel announced that Squirrel Girl would, for the first time, be starring in her own series, The Unbeatable Squirrel Girl, written by Ryan North and drawn by Erica Henderson. The series' first issue was released on January 7, 2015. The series' title alluded to the character's infeasible history of defeating high-level Marvel villains, and its central premise puts a twist on the idea, presenting Squirrel Girl as "unbeatable" because she always pursues non-violent solutions, befriending villains and helping them turn their lives around, rather than actually fighting them.

The Unbeatable Squirrel Girl ran for eight issues before being rebooted in October 2015 as part of the All-New, All-Different Marvel branding with Squirrel Girl being part of The New Avengers. The Unbeatable Squirrel Girl continued as monthly publication until November 2019, for a total of 58 issues. Derek Charm took over art duties in May 2018.

Strong trade sales at school book fairs encouraged the team to develop an original graphic novel, The Unbeatable Squirrel Girl Beats Up The Marvel Universe!, released in October 2016. While Henderson told The Hollywood Reporter balancing the graphic novel and monthly series "was almost too much work," North expressed interest in another graphic novel, calling it "a fun challenge."

Starting in 2017, Squirrel Girl appeared in U.S.Avengers, a replacement title for The New Avengers.

Podcast continuation 
In April 2022, Marvel Entertainment and Sirius XM launched Marvel's Squirrel Girl: The Unbeatable Radio Show which is a six-episode podcast series that acts as a direct continuation of the comic series. It is written by North, directed by Giovanna Sardelli and stars Milana Vayntrub as Squirrel Girl; the series is produced by Radio Point. Additionally, North "wrote an all-new 'Squirrel Girl' vertical comic tie-in" which debuted on Marvel Unlimited.

Fictional character biography

Doreen Allene Green was born to Dorian and Maureen Green in Canada. When she was 10 years old, Doreen discovered she could communicate with squirrels; she suffered a modification in her genes for unknown reasons that granted her squirrel-like abilities, which manifested predominantly as a prehensile tail.
When her parents consulted a doctor, it was determined that Doreen wasn't a mutant, even though she believed so for a long time. She is first seen as Squirrel Girl ambushing Iron Man in a forest, hoping to impress the veteran hero and become his sidekick. The 14-year-old introduces herself and her pet squirrel, Monkey Joe, and displays her squirrel-themed abilities. After she rescues Iron Man from Doctor Doom with the help of a horde of squirrels, Iron Man says she is too young to fight crime, but that he will put in a good word for her to the Avengers when she is older.

Great Lakes Avengers
Years later, having moved to New York City, Doreen joins the Great Lakes Avengers. Squirrel Girl introduces each issue of the team's miniseries, providing an opinion about the contents of the series. Her sidekick Monkey Joe also joins the team and comments upon the series as well. He is later killed by Leather Boy, a rejected GLA member who was disguised as Doctor Doom. Enraged by the death of her friend, Squirrel Girl assembles a squirrel army to stop the villain Maelstrom. She finds a new squirrel companion during this battle, the only one of her squirrel army who survived. Doreen names her Tippy-Toe. After receiving a subpoena from the Avengers and discovering that her teammates are all mutants, the team renames themselves the Great Lakes X-Men, complete with new costumes.

During the GLX-Mas Special, Squirrel Girl and Tippy-Toe defeat the supervillains MODOK, Terrax, and Thanos. S.H.I.E.L.D. agent Dum Dum Dugan tries to recruit her, explaining that the organization had been watching her for some time. Doreen declines the offer, saying she is happy with the Great Lakes X-Men.

After helping the Thing defeat Bi-Beast, Squirrel Girl was invited to the annual Superheroes Poker Tournament and brought the team with her. In the end, Flatman won the tournament with a straight flush, beating the Thing's four fours. After being discouraged from using the names X-Men and Defenders by members of those teams present at the tournament, and since Flatman was the champion of the tournament, the team renamed themselves the Great Lakes Champions, despite protests from former Champions of Los Angeles member Hercules.

During the Civil War crossover storyline, Squirrel Girl and the Great Lakes Champions registered under the Superhuman Registration Act, as revealed when Deadpool attempted to apprehend them for violating the Act, only to be defeated and informed that they had already registered. Under the Registration Act, Squirrel Girl remains a member of the again-renamed Great Lakes Initiative.

Squirrel Girl and the GLI, along with Deadpool, are sent to save Dionysus after he fell from Mount Olympus and was captured by A.I.M., who planned to use his powers to cause mental instability in superheroes they consider a threat. After their victory, Squirrel Girl helps Dionysus back to Olympus and to his own bed to sleep it off. (It is later revealed that she is a fan of the superhero team the New Warriors, especially Robbie Baldwin, the hero Speedball, on whom she has a crush, and the two eventually share a kiss.) Squirrel Girl convinces Doctor Doom to let her use a time machine to prevent Speedball from becoming the guilt-plagued hero Penance. The device instead takes her into the year 2099, where she encounters an alternate, future version of Speedball, whom she unsuccessfully tries to have return with her to her present day. She also encounters a future version of Mister Immortal who convinces her to kick Deadpool out of the team, which she does after returning to her own time.

During the Secret Invasion storyline, the team confronted a Skrull disguised as Grasshopper, with help from Gravity and Catwalk. They later appeared to welcome Gravity as leader of the team, after he was transferred to Wisconsin by Norman Osborn.

After defeating Fin Fang Foom and finding little support from her teammates on the again renamed Great Lakes Avengers, whom she believes have her shoulder most of their work, she exits the group.

New Avengers
When Luke Cage and Jessica Jones seek a nanny for their daughter Danielle, they hire Squirrel Girl. It is also revealed that Doreen had a brief relationship with Wolverine (then a member of the New Avengers), which did not end happily. During the Spider-Island storyline, Danielle gains spider powers. During the Fear Itself storyline, Squirrel Girl runs to the mansion to pick up Danielle while New York is attacked by the Thule Society. Upon arriving on the mansion, she and Daredevil protect Danielle while fighting Thule Society soldiers.

She later helps the New Avengers fight the Revengers, H.A.M.M.E.R., and the Dark Avengers. When Luke Cage and Jessica Jones leave the team, Squirrel Girl follows them as Danielle's nanny.

She and Tippy Toe have since rejoined the team in the wake of the Secret Wars.

The Unbeatable Squirrel Girl
Doreen begins her college career at Empire State University, majoring in computer science. Upon arriving, she ends up fighting Kraven the Hunter, who was lashing out at the local squirrels including Tippy Toe, whom he caught and was about to kill. She stops him by informing him of the existence of sea monsters like Giganto and challenges him to hunt them. Later, she discovers that Galactus is heading to Earth to devour it, and she steals Iron Man's armor and heads to the Moon with Tippy-Toe. On their way, they defeat Whiplash, who had attacked Squirrel Girl, mistaking her for Iron Man. She and Tippy-Toe surprisingly befriend Galactus instead of fighting him, and afterwards tell him of a planet that could sustain him even better than the Earth. This planet is devoid of intelligent life but rich in nuts, which Galactus has developed a new liking for. He then sends the two back home, and he leaves the Earth to live another day. When she arrives back home, her roommate Nancy Whitehead tells her that she has figured out she is a superhero, but promises not to tell anyone, the two becoming good friends. Later, Squirrel Girl and other superheroes defeat Mysterion, who was attacking Liberty Island with an army of robot dinosaurs. Shortly thereafter, while attempting to stop Hippo from robbing a bank, she meets Chipmunk Hunk and Koi Boi, both of whom have the ability to speak to different animals. Nancy reveals their secret identities (Tomas Lara-Perez and Ken Shiga, respectively) to her, since she easily recognized them under their masks. They later encounter a monstrous Asgardian squirrel god, Ratatoskr, who had been causing mayhem on the city by trash-talking its citizens during their sleep, but is defeated with help from Loki and the current and former Thor.

During their second college year, Doreen and Nancy encounter Brain Drain and quickly defeat him due to his extremely outdated technology and crucial design flaws. Upon realizing that he did not have a choice about his evil actions due to his programming, Doreen and Nancy updated his technology to modern standards. When he awakens, Brain Drain reveals that he intended to reform and ends up enrolling at ESU to take computer science courses. Later, she and her classmates get sent back in time to the 1960s by fellow student Cody (who sent them away from the present time to curve his grade). Nancy, the only person who remembers Doreen's existence, goes back to rescue her along with a past version of Doctor Doom, who then learns that he'll successfully take over the world thanks to a copy of Wikipedia on Nancy's phone. In the present day, Cody wakes up to a Doctor Doom dystopia and takes himself back to the 1960s with an older, future Doreen to help fight Doom. Doreen defeats Doom by repeatedly using Cody's time machine to send herself a day before the fight, creating a small army of Squirrel Girls that swarm Doom and force him to give up. Doreen and the students are sent back to the present, while future Doreen stays behind and continues to foil Doom's schemes. One of the Doombots manages to survive and becomes obsessed with living a "normal" human life. He later ends up hiring and then facing off against Gwenpool in an attempt to remove a group of aliens that are hunting her from the planet. After changing his plans upon deciding that Gwen herself is the bigger threat he tries to team up with the aliens and destroy her. This backfires and she forces him to fight the aliens by threatening his kind elderly neighbors. He does capitulates and to his horror gets the credit for destroying the aliens and becomes a media sensation as everyone wonders what heroics he will do next, ruining his idealistic normal life.

Later, she gets jealous when her crush, Chipmunk Hunk, starts dating a classmate named Mary. Nancy, Tippy Toe, and Koi Boi help set her up an online dating profile, which leads to many unsuccessful dates, one of which ends with an encounter with the Mole Man, who is angered by how Doreen's earlier suggestions to Kraven has affected his home. Doreen apologizes to him and the two have a conversation about his situation, leading the Mole Man to proposing to Doreen on the spot and a number of follow up schemes to get Doreen to go on a date with him. He threatens to bury a number of worldwide landmarks if she doesn't date him, and after Nancy is nearly kidnapped by him and being swarmed by the media, she goes to confront Mole Man only to find that the Tricephalous is in love with him. Doreen lets the beast defeat her to woo Mole Man and get him off her back for good, and decides that dating isn't right for her at the moment after seeing that Mary is a nice fit for Chipmunk Hunk.

Squirrel Girl also had an alternate version of herself due to time travel running around for decades interfering with Doctor Doom's plans. As a result, she released an AI Doombot that eventually became Gwenpool's nemesis, Vincent Doonan. They later reconcile and at Gwen's insistence he even lets Squirrel Girl examine him for her computer class. She then follows Gwenpool to Hell to rescue her brother Teddy Poole and they defeat Mephisto. While there though Gwen points out that in the Marvel universe the devil is very real and punchable, suggesting that heroes should do so all the time confusing Squirrel Girl. Running out of pages, Gwen then leaves, getting Teddy back to Earth to her and runs off to do other things before her comic comes to an end.

Another alternate version of Squirrel Girl is created when Doreen falls into a piece of technology which Tony Stark had obtained from the High Evolutionary; the clone is nicknamed Allene and is like Doreen in most every way except she is lacking in the restraint and empathy which largely defines Doreen's career as a superhero. Allene strives to create a world where squirrels are the dominant species, sending an army of squirrely into the cloning device to rid them of their restraint and imprisoning every superhero who stands in her way in the Negative Zone. When Doreen gives her last effort to appeal to Allene's humanity, Allene instead banishes Doreen to the moon, where a dying Doreen summons Thor's hammer Mjolnir, becoming Squirrel Thor. After freeing all the heroes from the Negative Zone, Doreen relinquishes Mjolnir and Allene willingly banishes herself and her squirrel army into the Negative Zone, where they shape it into the squirrel-centric utopia she had strived to create in the first place. Doreen and her friends would go on on to visit Allene in the Negative Zone on later occasions.

Squirrel Girl later becomes a member of the U.S.Avengers. She later receives a wealthy benefactor in Melissa Morbeck, a woman who can talk to animals who gives Doreen a new "flying squirrel" suit. Morbeck is quickly revealed to be a supervillain, however, who uses technology to exert sadistic control over animals and unleashes an army of insects and wild animals on the city, disguising one of her animal minions as Doctor Doom. While Squirrel Girl, Chipmunk Hunk, and Koi Boi subdue the animal army, Nancy and Mary set off an electromagnetic pulse to disable Morbeck's control over the animals, leading to her arrest. Later stories see Squirrel Girl traveling to the Savage Land and outer space, where she clashes with Loki, Drax the Destroyer, and the Silver Surfer. After she returns home, a clash with a small-time livestreaming criminal inadvertently sends Doreen and Nancy into hypertime, where they spend the next weekend growing old together as they rid crime in the city, take up various hobbies, and eventually develop the technology to send themselves back into regular time, but not before writing a note to their younger selves. They then revert to their normal ages and lose all memory of their life in hypertime, with only the note to remember it by.

While visiting Allene in the Negative Zone, Squirrel Girl is summoned by Loki to help fight the Frost Giants in the War of the Realms. There she once again encounters Ratatoskr, with whom she clashes yet eventually forms an unlikely, if uneasy, alliance. Afterwards, Melissa Morbeck returns with an alliance of supervillains (including Doctor Doom, M.O.D.O.K.,  Leader, and Whiplash) to enact revenge on Squirrel Girl - kidnapping Brain Drain, stealing Iron Man's armor, attacking Doreen's apartment, and finally publicly leaking her secret identity. Several heroes and villains from across the Marvel universe come to Squirrel Girl's aid, including Kraven the Hunter, Ratatoskr, the Rhino, Mole Man, Tony Stark, and eventually Galactus, who uses the power cosmic to teleport away Morbeck and her allies and return Stark his armor. Afterwards, Stark publicly broadcasts a video which celebrates Squirrel Girl's various achievements.

The Unbeatable Squirrel Girl Radio Show! 
In the aftermath of the attack on her apartment and her leaked secret identity, Squirrel Girl hosts of an AM broadcast call-in show where she answers questions regarding what it's like to be a superhero. She's joined by her friends Tippy T. Squirrel, Nancy Whitehead, Koi Boi, Chipmunk Hunk and Brain Drain.

Powers, abilities, and equipment
During Squirrel Girl's first encounter with Iron Man, she provided a detailed demonstration of her powers and abilities: a furry, prehensile tail roughly 3–4 feet long, sizable buck teeth strong enough to chew through wood, and superhuman strength and agility that allows her to easily jump between trees. Her fingers have sharp claws that assist her with climbing, and she possesses retractable "knuckle spikes" roughly 2-3 inches long on each hand. Most importantly, she can communicate with and understand squirrels, but does not communicate with squirrels telepathically. Squirrels have also been depicted as understanding her when she speaks in English.

Later appearances have revealed additional abilities possessed by Squirrel Girl including heightened reflexes (which she dubs as 'squirrelgility') and vision (her eyes have been seen to glow red in low-light situations) and she has also at times displayed an enhanced sense of smell. Squirrel Girl has also revealed that her lips taste like hazelnuts, though this attribute has since been retconned by Unbeatable Squirrel Girl writer Ryan North. She is also a superb hand-to-hand combatant capable of taking down Wolverine in a one-to-one no-claws fight.

Squirrel Girl carries a utility belt comprising multiple pouches that contain nuts to give as snacks to her squirrel friends. These are known humorously as her "nut sacks". It was originally unknown whether the black markings around her eyes are the result of her mutation, or cosmetically applied to enhance her squirrel-themed appearance (though they did not appear to smear when she's crying). In The New Avengers Annual #1, she is shown in casual clothes lacking these markings.

Squirrel Girl is also shown carrying a full set of 'Iron Man Vs. Series battle cards', which she uses to show Dum Dum Dugan how she knows him (she mentions Dugan has a 'defense stat of 8'; her own is 6, although the rating system is left unclear). After MODOK is pointed out to her, she consults the supervillain's own card to confirm his abilities. The printing on the two cards shown (Dugan's and MODOK's) is actually gibberish. In her solo series The Unbeatable Squirrel Girl, she has a set of 'Deadpool's guide to Super Villains' cards to help her identify villains and their possible weaknesses. The writing on these are legible, and tend to contain both valuable information  as well as comedic jokes about her opponents. She only owns the super villain set, though some antiheroes such as Ant-Man still have cards in her collection.

In the GLX-Mas Special, she is shown flying a small gyrocopter called a 'Squirrel-A-Gig' and mentions it was a gift from GLA teammate Big Bertha. This reappears in Deadpool/GLI Summer Fun Spectacular, used as a way of infiltrating Doctor Doom's castle. The first version was a standard gyrocopter, while it is later shown as a more stylized superhero helicopter (including squirrel-styled bodywork). Squirrel Girl is shown as being able to fly the craft expertly, including through the anti-aircraft defenses surrounding Castle Doom, crediting this to her 'squirrel-agility'.

In The Unbeatable Squirrel Girl, she also temporarily obtains a set of armor based on pieces of Iron Man's modular armor that reshapes to fit her, including her tail. The same series also retcons her status as a mutant, noting that her powers are the result of an unspecified "something" relating to her RNA or DNA, and that she is "medically and legally distinct from being a mutant."

In the graphic novel The Unbeatable Squirrel Girl Beats Up the Marvel Universe, she is shown as being worthy of wielding Mjolnir, becoming Squirrel Thor when she does so.

Another ability showcased in The Unbeatable Squirrel Girl is Doreen's enhanced jaw strength. Due to her proportional squirrel abilities, she can bite with one million and eighty-five thousand pounds of pressure. This gives her the ability to bite through solid steel.

Known squirrels
Squirrel Girl is always accompanied by one or more squirrels. Two of these, Monkey Joe and later his successor Tippy-Toe, have been her constant companion. At her insistence, they have each been accepted as a full member of the Great Lakes Avengers.

In addition to Monkey Joe and Tippy-Toe, Squirrel Girl named several other squirrels in Great Lakes Avengers #4. Slippy Pete, Mr. Freckle, and Nutso are presumed dead; they were sucked into the singularity created by Maelstrom.

Monkey Joe
Monkey Joe appeared in Squirrel Girl's original appearance in Marvel Super-Heroes Special vol. 2 #8, and all four issues of the Great Lakes Avengers miniseries.

The trade paperback of the Great Lakes Avengers miniseries contains a dedication to the memory of Monkey Joe: "Monkey Joe 1992-2005. He loved nuts. He will be missed."

In Squirrel Girl's first appearance, Monkey Joe helped her to defeat Doctor Doom. Shortly after Squirrel Girl joined the Great Lakes Avengers, Monkey Joe met his demise at the hands of Leather Boy, an ex-G.L.A. member who had been rejected by the team due to his lack of powers, and who dispatched the squirrel while dressed in a variation of Doctor Doom's costume. Monkey Joe's death was part of the series' promise that a member of the G.L.A. would die in each issue of the miniseries, in a parody of comic book deaths.

Monkey Joe was smarter than an average squirrel, even proving adept in the use of computers. He served as the sardonic commentator on the Great Lakes Avengers miniseries, appearing alongside the story titles holding signs with humorous, often sarcastic, remarks on the events. After his death, the narrator circle showed a deceased Monkey Joe, complete with flies circling the corpse. Reappearing in the narrator circle, he possessed a halo.

When Doorman visited the afterlife, he met Monkey Joe, who was playing cards with the rest of the fallen G.L.A. members.

Tippy-Toe
After the death of Monkey Joe, Squirrel Girl found a new companion, a female squirrel whom she named Tippy-Toe and provided with a pink bow. Tippy-Toe replicates Monkey Joe's role as Squirrel Girl's sidekick almost exactly. Though apparently less intelligent than Monkey Joe, Tippy-Toe may in fact be smarter than she lets on and has proved her worth in short order.

A member of the squirrel army summoned by Squirrel Girl to join the fight against Maelstrom and Batroc's Brigade, Tippy-Toe was the only squirrel Doreen was able to save from Maelstrom's Cosmic Crunch device. Squirrel Girl also briefly considered the name Monkey Joe 2 for her.

Tippy-Toe accompanied and assisted Squirrel Girl in defeating MODOK and Thanos (she scratched MODOK's face, then entered his exo-chair and disabled it). Squirrel Girl left Tippy-Toe behind when she went to fight Terrax, and the squirrel was targeted by Deathurge, who sought vengeance for being stranded on Earth and trapped in squirrel form. However, Tippy-Toe managed to trick Deathurge and defeat him, with help from Mr. Immortal. During the Civil War story arc, Tippy-Toe joined the Great Lakes Champions in siding with Iron Man's pro-Superhuman Registration group.

Tippy-Toe is able to understand her teammate's comments, complaining when Doorman discounts her as a viable teammate for a mission. She has also been seen using tools that a squirrel wouldn't normally be able to use such as being able to wield a screwdriver and operate a blender which Mr. Immortal complains to Squirrel Girl about Tippy-Toe whipping up acorn smoothies that keep compromising the machine.

Squirrel Girl's victories
Following her defeat of Doctor Doom, an ongoing joke depicts Squirrel Girl repeatedly attaining victory over various villains, some of whom are considered to be more powerful than she is. Typically, these victories occur off-panel, though some, like her battles with Deadpool, MODOK, and Wolverine are shown. Her victories often result from her opponent's overconfidence, weakness from an earlier fight, or creative use of her powers. For example, her defeat of Bi-Beast: While visiting squirrel friends in Central Park, Squirrel Girl came across the Thing fighting Bi-Beast. She told the squirrels to retrieve the smelliest garbage they could find and place it around the combatants, resulting in everyone having to hold their noses. Bi-Beast had two heads, and two noses, and had to use both hands to hold his noses, leaving himself defenseless, allowing the Thing to knock him out.

Squirrel Girl's defeat of Thanos is an ambiguous one. Uatu the Watcher was present at the battle and claimed Squirrel Girl defeated the genuine Thanos and not a clone or copy. However, the same writer responsible for that story would soon after write another tale in which Thanos claimed to have perfected a means of creating clones of himself that could fool even "the most cosmic of beings." Adding to the ambiguity is the fact that the reveal comes from the mind of a clone whose memory had been altered.

Squirrel Girl has also saved the world from Galactus, but she does not technically defeat him (though she tries to harm him when they first meet). Instead, she befriends Galactus and convinces him not to destroy the Earth.

Reception

Critical reception 
Writer Brian Michael Bendis mentioned the popularity that Squirrel Girl has among writers as a factor in the unanimous decision to use her in the role of the nanny in "New Avengers." After announcing the character at the 2010 Comic-con panel, Bendis described the audience's reaction: "[it] was so loud, the applause went on for so long ... the place went nuts for a while." He described the applause as comparable to that received by Stan Lee when he entered the room. IGN has reacted positively to her appearance in the more mainstream New Avengers comic, claiming, "issue [15] goes a long way towards painting her as a more fleshed out human being with real desires. Bendis hasn't quite found a truly unique voice for her yet, but regardless, it's nice to see her offering something more than comic relief."

Co-creator Will Murray has expressed interest in returning to the character: "I’ve been thinking of pitching Marvel a Squirrel Girl project. She's defeated most of the major Marvel super villains. It's time she met her match in The Ultimate Pistachio." Marvel's previous editor-in-chief Joe Quesada joked, "I've always wanted to do a Squirrel Girl miniseries or a Squirrel Girl event – 'Squirrel Girl Destroys Your Nuts!' ... I haven't been able to sell it yet, but I keep on trying."

Accolades 
UGO Networks listed Squirrel Girl as one of their "Women We're Ashamed to Be Attracted To" and put Squirrel Girl as one of the more questionable D-list superheroes that they still loved anyway. GameZone's Ben Perlee has stated that Squirrel Girl was one of the characters he'd want to see in Marvel vs. Capcom 3 as downloadable content.

In 2022, Screen Rant included Squirrel Girl in their "10 Female Marvel Heroes That Should Come To The MCU" list.

Other versions

Marvel Zombies
A zombified Squirrel Girl along with her 'Squirrel-A-Gig' make an appearance in Marvel Zombies: Evil Evolution. The severed zombified head of Mr. Fantastic comments, "There's a zombie Squirrel Girl? Now that's scary!"
A zombie Squirrel Girl also appears in the Marvel Zombies: Halloween special, where she - and other zombified superheroes - are hunting Kitty Pryde's son Peter until they are both saved by Mephisto.

Avengers vs. X-Men
Squirrel Girl makes an appearance in a bonus story of Avengers vs. X-Men: Versus #6. Here she is depicted competing against Pixie in a game resembling HeroClix where the toys are based on various superheroes. Thing walks in, stopping the game to reveal that the figurines actually belong to the Puppet Master and are made out of his "Mind Control Clay". The next day, Squirrel Girl and Pixie read in the Daily Bugle that the clash between the Avengers and X-Men has occurred and have been mirroring the results from their game, implying that they were the cause of the feud.

Marvel Universe vs. The Avengers
Squirrel Girl and Jessica Jones are killed by Luke Cage after he succumbs to the Survivor 118, a virus that causes those infected by it to become feral to the point of engaging in cannibalism.

In other media

Television

 Squirrel Girl appears in the Fantastic Four: World's Greatest Heroes episode "The Cure", voiced by Rebecca Shoichet. She auditions to replace Ben Grimm on the Fantastic Four, only to be immediately rejected.
 Squirrel Girl appears in Ultimate Spider-Man, voiced by Misty Lee. Introduced in the episode "Agent Venom", this version is one of many young superheroes who were inspired by Spider-Man and monitored by S.H.I.E.L.D. Later in the season, she goes on to join the New Warriors and become a student at the S.H.I.E.L.D. Academy.
 Squirrel Girl was meant to appear in Marvel's New Warriors, portrayed by Milana Vayntrub, before the series was cancelled during production.

Marvel Rising
Squirrel Girl appears in media set in the Marvel Rising franchise, voiced by Milana Vayntrub. This version is the best friend of Ms. Marvel and a founding member of the Secret Warriors. She first appears in the film Marvel Rising: Secret Warriors and returns in a series of sequel shorts.

Video games
 Squirrel Girl appears in Pinball FX 2 via the Marvel's Women of Power DLC.
 Squirrel Girl appears as a playable character in Marvel Super Hero Squad Online, voiced by Tara Strong.
 Squirrel Girl appears as a playable character in Marvel Super Hero Squad: Comic Combat.
 Squirrel Girl appears as an unlockable character in Marvel: Avengers Alliance.
 Squirrel Girl appears as a playable character in Marvel Heroes, voiced again by Tara Strong.
 Squirrel Girl appears in Marvel Puzzle Quest.
 Squirrel Girl appears as a playable character in Lego Marvel Super Heroes, voiced again by Tara Strong.
 Squirrel Girl appears as a playable character in Lego Marvel's Avengers, voiced again by Misty Lee.
 Squirrel Girl appears as a playable character in Marvel Contest of Champions.
 Squirrel Girl appears as a playable character in Marvel Future Fight.
 Squirrel Girl appears as a playable character in Marvel Strike Force.

Miscellaneous
 Doreen Green makes a cameo appearance in Web Slingers: A Spider-Man Adventure as a rookie engineer of the Worldwide Engineering Brigade (WEB) program.
 Squirrel Girl appears in the young adult novel The Unbeatable Squirrel Girl: Squirrel Meets World, Shannon & Dean Hale. 
 Squirrel Girl appears in the young adult novel The Unbeatable Squirrel Girl: 2 Fuzzy, 2 Furious.
 Squirrel Girl appears in Squirrel Girl Goes to College: A Squirrel Girl Play, played by Alyssa Buckner.

Merchandise
The Marvel Rising incarnation of Squirrel Girl received a Target exclusive doll as part of the franchise's tie-in toyline.

Collected editions 
Trade paperback

Graphic Novel Trade Paperback

Hardcover

Original Graphic Novel

References

External links
Squirrel Girl at the Grand Comics Database

Article at Marvel Universe: the Official Marvel Wiki

Avengers (comics) characters
Characters created by Steve Ditko
Comics characters introduced in 1991
Fictional characters from Los Angeles
Fictional characters with superhuman senses
Marvel Comics American superheroes
Marvel Comics characters who can move at superhuman speeds
Marvel Comics characters with superhuman strength
Marvel Comics female superheroes